The Premio Presidente della Repubblica is a Group 2 flat horse race in Italy open to thoroughbreds aged four years or older. It is run over a distance of 1,800 metres (about 1⅛ miles) at Capannelle in May.

History
The event was established in 1879, and it was originally called the Premio Omnium. It was initially open to horses aged three or older and contested over 3,500 metres. The first running was won by Macedonie. It was cut to 2,400 metres in 1882.

The race continued as the Premio Omnium until 1955. It was renamed the Premio Presidente della Repubblica in 1956. This was to commemorate the tenth anniversary of Italy becoming a republic.

The Premio Presidente della Repubblica was run over 2,200 metres in 1966. It was extended to 2,300 metres in 1967 and reduced to 2,000 metre in 1968. In 2016 it was reduced to 1,800 metres and downgraded to Group 2 having previously been contested at Group 1 level.

The race was closed to three-year-olds in 1988.

Records
Most successful horse (3 wins):
 Sansonetto – 1895, 1896 (dead-heat), 1898

Leading jockey (5 wins):
 Silvio Parravani – Murghab (1949), Alberigo (1953, 1955), Falerno (1954), Sedan (1959)

Leading trainer since 1985 (4 wins):

 Stefano Botti - Crackerjack King (2012), Vedelago (2013), Cleo Fan (2015), Time To Choose (2017)

Leading owner (12 wins):
 Razza Dormello-Olgiata – Bellini (1941), Tenerani (1948), Adam (1950), Tissot (1957), Antelami (1963), Haseltine (1965), Ben Marshall (1966), Appiani (1967), Hogarth (1970), Mannsfeld (1974, 1975), Maffei (1982)

Winners since 1985

Earlier winners

 1879: Macedonie
 1880: Don Pasquale
 1881: Arc
 1882: Sensation
 1883: Fakir / Poeonia 1
 1884: Andreina
 1885: Andreina
 1886: Mantle
 1887: Pythagoras
 1888: Filiberto
 1889: Rabicano
 1890: Fitz Hampton
 1891: Beppina
 1892: Lucifer
 1893: Caio
 1894: Greco
 1895: Sansonetto
 1896: Pistenhuit / Sansonetto 1
 1897: Hareng
 1898: Sansonetto
 1899: Serpentina
 1900: Marcantonio
 1901: Marcantonio
 1902: Tarantella
 1903: Tarantella
 1904: Marzio
 1905: Cesar
 1906: Ulpiano
 1907: Olivo
 1908: Demetrio
 1909: Moroldo
 1910: Sambar
 1911: Badajoz
 1912: Makufa
 1913: Sigma
 1914: Prometeo
 1915: Giulio Romano
 1916–20: no race
 1921: Lord Allan
 1922: Marcus
 1923: Fiorello
 1924: Scopas
 1925: Manistee
 1926: Manistee
 1927: Paulo
 1928: Varedo
 1929: Nesiotes
 1930: Cavaliere d'Arpino
 1931: Sans Crainte
 1932: Rumex
 1933: Kennebe
 1934: Pilade
 1935: Partenio
 1936: Nipissing
 1937: De Albertis
 1938: El Greco
 1939: Gaio
 1940: Sabla
 1941: Bellini
 1942: Scire
 1943: Cola d'Amatrice
 1944: De Nittis 2
 1945: no race
 1946: Grifone
 1947: Scanno
 1948: Tenerani
 1949: Murghab
 1950: Adam
 1951: Nuccio
 1952: Iroquois
 1953: Alberigo
 1954: Falerno
 1955: Alberigo
 1956: Vittor Pisani
 1957: Tissot
 1958: Ismone
 1959: Sedan
 1960: Surdi
 1961: Surdi
 1962: Faenza
 1963: Antelami
 1964: Veronese
 1965: Haseltine
 1966: Ben Marshall
 1967: Appiani
 1968: Caspoggio
 1969: Light Wind
 1970: Hogarth
 1971: Maestrale
 1972: Hoche
 1973: Moulton
 1974: Mannsfeld
 1975: Mannsfeld
 1976: Shamsan
 1977: Capo Bon
 1978: Stone
 1979: Rolle
 1980: Deauville
 1981: Ladislao di Oppelm
 1982: Maffei
 1983: Jalmood
 1984: Bater

1 The 1883 and 1896 races were dead-heats and have joint winners.2 The 1944 running took place at Milan.

See also
 List of Italian flat horse races
 Recurring sporting events established in 1879 – this race is included under its original title, Premio Omnium.

References

 Racing Post:
 capannelleippodromo.it – Albo d'Oro – Premio Presidente della Repubblica.
 galopp-sieger.de – Premio Presidente della Repubblica (ex Omnium).
 horseracingintfed.com – International Federation of Horseracing Authorities – Race Detail (2017).
 pedigreequery.com – Premio Presidente della Repubblica – Roma Capannelle.

Open middle distance horse races
Sports competitions in Rome
Horse races in Italy